James Keeley (October 14, 1867 – June 7, 1934) was an American newspaper editor and publisher.  He served as managing editor of the Chicago Tribune from 1898 to 1914.

Keeley was born in London, England. His mother was a teacher who had been deserted by her husband, who was Irish Catholic. He immigrated to the United States on his own, settling in Kansas at age 16.  His career in the newspaper business started as a correspondent for the Kansas City Times.  He also worked at a number of other papers and by the late 1880s was at the Chicago Tribune, rising to the positions of managing editor and general manager from 1898 to 1914.  He served as Dean of the school of journalism at the University of Notre Dame, in South Bend, Indiana, from 1911.

After the deadly Iroquois Theatre fire in 1903, Keeley famously listed all the victims on the front page of the paper, leaving the story of what happened to the inside of the paper, believing that readers wanted to see the names of the dead first.   He was also known for lobbying for a "sane Fourth" of July to stop fireworks deaths, and for tracking down fugitive Chicago bank president Paul O. Stensland.

In 1914, Keeley bought two papers, the Chicago Record Herald and Chicago Inter Ocean, and named the combined paper the Chicago Herald.  The Herald was bought by William Randolph Hearst's Chicago Examiner in 1918, and named the Chicago Herald and Examiner.  Keeley also did war reporting from Europe during World War I.

Keeley also was a vice-president of the Pullman Company in the 1920s.

Keeley died at his home in Lake Forest, Illinois on June 7, 1934, after being ill since January with heart disease.  His wife, a former newspaper writer in Boston and for the Tribune whom he married in 1895, died in 1927.  Their daughter Dorothy Aldis was a children's author and poet.

References

Further reading
Linn, James Weber. James Keeley, newspaperman (biography of Keeley published in 1937)

External links
 James Keeley papers, 1895-1937

1867 births
1934 deaths
American newspaper editors
American newspaper publishers (people)
People from London
American male journalists
British emigrants to the United States